Dolomena variabilis, common name : the Variable Conch, is a species of sea snail, a marine gastropod mollusk in the family Strombidae, the true conchs.

Description
The shell size varies between 25 mm and 60 mm.

Distribution
This species is distributed in the Pacific Ocean along the Philippines, Samoa, Indonesia and Northeast Australia.

References

 Chenu, 1844 Parts 26-27. In Illustrations Conchyliologiques ou description et figures de toutes les coquilles connues vivantes et fossiles, classées suivant le système de Lamarck modifié d'après les progrès de la science et comprenant les genres nouveaux et les espèces récemment découvertes, p. Strombus pp 1-8 ; Spondylus pl 28, 29 ; Pecten pl 2, 8, 3, 4, 44-6 ; Cassis pl 2 ; Vermetus pl; 4 ; Dentalium pl 7

External links
 

Strombidae
Gastropods described in 1820
Taxa named by William John Swainson
Molluscs of the Pacific Ocean